Giannini Peak is a peak  east-southeast of Mount Nordhill in the eastern part of Palmer Land, Antarctica. The peak stands on the north side of Dana Glacier at the point where the glacier makes a left (northeast) turn toward Lehrke Inlet. It was mapped by the United States Geological Survey in 1974, and named by the Advisory Committee on Antarctic Names for Albert P. Giannini, a United States Antarctic Research Program biologist at Palmer Station, 1973.

References

Mountains of Palmer Land